I'm Gay may denote:

I'm Gay (Lil B album), a rap album by Lil B
"I'm Gay" (6 AM song)
"I'm Gay" (Bowling for Soup song)